Merrijig is a town in North-East Victoria, Australia, located between Mount Buller and Mansfield.

The first Merrijig Post Office opened on 4 October 1866 and was replaced by Boggy Creek in 1867. Another Merrijig Post Office opened on 1 April 1866 (known as Delatite from 1872 until 1924) and closed in 1970.

A second placename in Victoria named "Merrijig" exists in East Gippsland, about 10 kilometres north of Lindenow.

The long held school of thought pertaining to the name Merrijig was that it was named for the town of Merrijig in Ireland of which the landscape resembles, there is a possible connection to Port Fairy where there is a ‘Merrijig Inn.’ Another school of thought is that it is an Aboriginal word meaning "good, well done". Merrijig is not a Taungurung (ie: local) language word, but rather a word drawn from early Aboriginal 'pidgin' English (other examples being 'budjeri' for 'good'; 'baal' for 'no' and 'yarraman' for 'horse'). Most other nearby area names derived from Indigenous Elders (& relatives) names, and end in the suffix “ite”; for example, Delatite, Booralite & Beolite.  As there are Merrijigs in Ireland, New Zealand and so forth, it is unlikely that the name is of Australian indigenous origins.
  
The Man from Snowy River was shot in Merrijig. It is also the location of Nevil Shute's novel The Far Country.

References

External links

Town website

Towns in Victoria (Australia)
Shire of Mansfield